New Geneva is an unincorporated community in Fayette County, Pennsylvania, United States. The community is located along Pennsylvania Route 166 and the Monongahela River, across from Greensboro. New Geneva has a post office, with ZIP code 15467.

References

Unincorporated communities in Fayette County, Pennsylvania
Unincorporated communities in Pennsylvania